The Title Conditions (Scotland) Act 2003 is an Act of the Scottish Parliament. It came into force on 28 November 2004, and is one element of a three part land reform abolishing feudal tenure and modernising Scottish property law, the other two elements being the Abolition of Feudal Tenure etc. (Scotland) Act 2000 and Tenements (Scotland) Act 2004 which came into effect on the same date.

The legislation primarily relates to real burdens, a key aspect of property law in Scotland, and defines them in section 1 of the Act as "an encumbrance on land constituted in favour of the owner of other land in that person’s capacity as owner of that other land". Section 2 of the Act specifies that a real burden must involve an obligation either to do something, or to refrain from doing something, relating to the property in question. The act provides a legal basis for real burdens in light of the abolition of feudal tenure.

See also
 Land Reform in Scotland

References

External links
 

Acts of the Scottish Parliament 2003
Scots property law
Feudalism in Scotland
Land reform in Scotland